Souls at Zero were an American heavy metal band.  They were originally known as Wrathchild America. The name change occurred after Wrathchild America was dropped from Atlantic Records in 1992, and was accompanied by a slight change in musical style, adopting a mixture between alternative and groove metal (similar to those of Pantera and Helmet) while also retaining some of the thrash metal roots of Wrathchild America. Souls at Zero released three albums on Energy Records before disbanding in the mid-1990s.

Name origin
The name "Souls at Zero" was taken from a chapter in the book The Great and Secret Show by horror writer Clive Barker. The name was originally intended for Shannon's and John "Tumor" Fahnestock's side project MF Pitbulls which also included 3/5 of the future band Snot.

History
With the onset of grunge in the early 1990s, mainstream interest in metal was on the decline. Wrathchild America became a casualty of the grunge-era, being dropped from Atlantic Records. Changing their look and style, they became Souls at Zero. Shannon Larkin left the band in 1994 to fill the drum seat in Ugly Kid Joe; he currently plays in Godsmack. Jamie Miller replaced Larkin, and played on A Taste for the Perverse. He left to join Snot, and currently plays in TheSTART, ...And You Will Know Us by the Trail of Dead, Normandie and Bad Religion. After touring in support of A Taste for the Perverse, the band broke up.

Band members
Former members
 Terry Carter – guitar, backing vocals (1992–1996)
 Shannon Larkin – drums, backing vocals (1992–1994)
 Brad Divens – bass, lead vocals (1992–1996)
 Jay Abbene – guitar, backing vocals (1992–1996)
 Jamie Miller – drums, backing vocals (1994–1996)
 Rich Spillberg – guitar, backing vocals (1995)

Discography

Studio albums
 Souls at Zero (1993)
 A Taste for the Perverse (1995)

EPs
 Six-T-Six (1994)

See also
 Wrathchild America

American thrash metal musical groups
Musical groups established in 1992
Musical groups disestablished in 1996
People from Martinsburg, West Virginia